{{Speciesbox
| image = Cymaenes trebius cropped.jpg
| genus = Cymaenes
| species = lumina
| authority = (Mabille, 1891)
| synonyms =  
 Pamphila trebius Mabille, 1891
 Cymaenes trebius (Mabille, 1891)
 Carystus odilia Burmeister, 1878
 Cymaenes odilia (Burmeister, 1878)

| synonyms_ref = 
}}Cymaenes lumina'', the fawn-spotted skipper, is a species of grass skipper in the butterfly family Hesperiidae. It is found in Central America, North America, and South America.

References

Further reading

 

Hesperiinae
Articles created by Qbugbot
Butterflies described in 1891